The Kaze is an American hip hop group from Memphis, Tennessee. It started its activities in the year 1990 to 2000 with MC Mack, Lil Corb and Project Pat, the group underwent several changes when Lil Corb's death was announced in 2013.

History
The group began their activities in the early 1990s in Memphis, consisting of Project Pat, Lil Corb and Scan Man. In 1995, the group (then known as "Killa Klan Kaze") was featured on a tape entitled, "Volume 3 Spring Mix 95", which contained the first track of Killa Klan Kaze, "Runnin 'Lip". The formation in the epoch consisted of MC Mack, Scan Man and K-Rock. They also had a track on Three 6 Mafia's 1995 EP, Live By Yo Rep, titled "Be a Witness". Project Pat ultimately replaced K-Rock and in 1998 the group released their first album entitled "KamiKaze Timez Up" and sold about 50,000 independent copies. The album was released with the production of Three 6 Mafia's Juicy J and DJ Paul. The album would be the only project released by the group together. 1999, the group's label, Prophet Entertainment shut down after label co-founders DJ Paul and Juicy J split from fellow label co-founder Nick Scarfo. The result was DJ Paul and Juicy J's creation of a new label, Hypnotize Minds. During this transition, artists from Prophet Entertainment moved over to Hypnotize Minds, with the notable exceptions of MC Mack and Scan Man. In, 1999 Scan Man and M.C. Mack founded their own "KamiKaze Inc." independent label and  released "Thugz From Southside: 2000 Mazdestruction".

In 2012, the group was nominated for music awards at the Memphis Music Hall of Fame and won the "Best Group" Award.

In 2020 one of the members (MC Mack) filed a lawsuit against the group Three 6 Mafia now for copyright alleging that since the 90s Three 6 Mafia have been using their music without any permission what disagreements between them and the lawsuit continues in court the Da Mafia tried to mitigate hired lawyer to resolve the parties. 
The case is still in court in Shelby County of Memphis, Tennessee.

Discography

Studio albums
 Kamakazie Timez Up (1998)
 Kami Kaze (2001)
 Only the Strong Survive (2005) 
 ''Kamakazie Times Up Part 2’’(2022)

Awards and nominations

References 

American crunk groups
African-American musical groups
American musical duos
Columbia Records artists
Gangsta rap groups
Horrorcore groups
Musical groups established in 1990
Rappers from Memphis, Tennessee
1990 establishments in Tennessee
1991 establishments in Tennessee
Hip hop groups from Memphis, Tennessee